Malema may refer to:

Malema, a small town in northern Mozambique
Julius Malema (born 1981), a South African politician

See also
Melema (disambiguation)